Kai Tak Sports Park is a multi-purpose sports venue that is being built at the site of the former Kai Tak Airport in Kowloon, Hong Kong. The sports park will be located on the north western part of the old Kai Tak Airport, where some of the parking stands used to be.

When it opens, Kai Tak Sports Park will become the largest sports venue in Hong Kong and will provide high quality sports facilities to support the future sports development of Hong Kong.

South China Morning Post reported that the sports park would be completed by 2023, but has since been postponed to 2024 due to construction materials shortage., costing HK$30 billion and would have a 50,000-seat Main Stadium with a retractable roof, a 10,000-seat Indoor Sports Center and a 5,000-seat Public Sports Ground.

Development 

American engineering firm AECOM was engaged by the Civil Engineering and Development Department of HKSAR to undertake the Kai Tak Development project in early 2007. In the 2011-12 policy address delivered by Hong Kong Chief Executive Donald Tsang, he stated that the government is studying financing options and mode of operation of the proposed multi-purpose stadium complex at Kai Tak and will start the preliminary work as soon as possible.

On 5 November 2012, the Home Affairs Bureau completed an initial technical feasibility study of the Kai Tak multi-purpose complex and submitted it to the Legislative Council. In the study, the bureau proposed a "design-build-operate" approach - design, construction, operations and maintenance under a single entity - to ensure effective delivery from designing the complex to its long-term operation. The study also recommended that the project be financially supported by a combination of government and private financing in order to maximize efficiency and innovation. The stadium will have a retractable roof and a capacity of 50,000 for international sports and entertainment events. The facilities were proposed to be completed by 2020.

HK$62.7 million in pre-construction funds for the Kai Tak Multi-purpose Sports Complex was approved by the Legislative Council Finance Committee members on 3 July 2015.

On 23 June 2017, the Hong Kong legislators in the finance committee granted the cash for the HK$31.9 billion sports complex in Kai Tak after a six-hour debate. 36 lawmakers green-lit the sports park, with 21 voting against it.

On 28 December 2018, the government announced that the contract for the design, construction and operation of the Kai Tak Sports Park was awarded to Kai Tak Sports Park Limited, a subsidiary of New World Development and NWS Holdings established specifically for the project.

The groundbreaking ceremony of the Kai Tak Sports Park was held on 23 April 2019.

Events 
Hong Kong will co-host the National Games with Guangdong and Macau in 2025, with the Kai Tak Sports Park as part of the hosting venues.

Facilities 

Kai Tak Sports Park is designed around a covered Kai Tak Sports Avenue, an indoor and outdoor pedestrian walkway starting at the Station Square (the connection to the park linking new MTR stops Kai Tak station and Sung Wong Toi station) and takes people all the way to the Dining Cove overlooking the Victoria Harbourfront.

Taking center stage at Kai Tak Sports Park, will be the 50,000 seat "Pearl of the Orient" themed Main Stadium. The stadium is complete with the latest technology in its retractable roof and a flexible pitch surface that can be switched between natural turf to other surfaces to host a range of international, regional and local events in any weather. It will also feature an infinity edge design above the south stand with a vast activity platform that looks out over Victoria Harbour.

Meanwhile, the sports park's Indoor Sports Center will provide a large multi-purpose space with retractable seating to host major competitions or events of up to 10,000 seats and to accommodate sports courts for community use. A 5,000 seat Public Sports Ground will also be provided for hosting school athletic events, athletic training and local league games.

Other facilities include more than 8 hectares of open spaces, outdoor ball courts, a children's playground, a health and wellness center, a bowling center and retail and dining outlets.

Transportation 
The sports park is easily accessible from the Kai Tak station and the Sung Wong Toi station on the Tuen Ma line, as well as to the Kowloon City Ferry Pier, Central Kowloon Route and neighboring bus stops.

Project Team 
Kai Tak Sports Park's project team members include Hip Hing Engineering, Populous, ASM Global and Lagardère Sports and Entertainment. Hip Hing Engineering is the main contractor of the project supported by Populous, SKA and Arup as design team.

Schedule and Penalties 
The government has imposed strict performance indicators for the Kai Tak Sports Park with a penalty of HK$500,000 for every day if the operator fails to meet usage requirements in the main stadium, HK$100,000 for the indoor centre and HK$50,000 for the public ground accordingly. The time for operational acceptance is 1,640 days (54 months) from the commencement of the contract (1 February 2019). This means that the park should be finished by June 2023.

In June 2022, the Commissioner for Sports, Yeung Tak-keung, blamed the Covid pandemic for the delay in opening dates to 2024, saying suppliers had faced difficulties in shipping construction materials to the territory, he added that the contractor won't be penalized for the delay, as no one could have foreseen the Covid pandemic when the contract was signed in 2019.

Nearby Facilities 
 Billion Centre
 Electrical and Mechanical Services Department Headquarters
 Hong Kong Children's Hospital
 Kai Tak Cruise terminal
 Kai Tak Grid Neighbourhood
 Kai Tak Runway Park
 Metro Park
 Kai Tak Sky Garden

See also
Kai Tak Airport
Kai Tak Development
Kowloon Walled City
Lion Rock
Lung Tsun Stone Bridge
Sport in Hong Kong

References

External links

 Official project site
Kai Tak Development, Home Affairs Bureau, Hong Kong
 New World Development
Kai Tak on the Move
Government awards contract for Kai Tak Sports Park

Proposed stadiums
Football venues in Hong Kong
Rugby union stadiums in Hong Kong
Proposed buildings and structures in Hong Kong
Kowloon City District
Music venues in Hong Kong